Acleris exsucana is a species of moth of the family Tortricidae. It is found in the Russian Far East (Ussuri), North Korea and Japan.

The wingspan is about 22 mm.

The larvae feed on Deutzia scabra and Viburnum opulus var. calvescens.

References

Moths described in 1901
exsucana
Moths of Asia